is a Japanese seinen manga magazine published by Houbunsha. The magazine is sold on the twenty-fourth of each month. Forward was the fourth magazine in the Manga Time Kirara line to be published, the first three being Manga Time Kirara, Manga Time Kirara Carat, and Manga Time Kirara Max. Forward was first published on March 23, 2006.

Manga serialized
Anne Happy
Dōjin Work
Ededen!
Itoshi no Karin
Family Restaurant Smile
Gakkō Gurashi!
Hanayamata
Harukana Receive
Hōkago Saitensei!
Kannonji Suiren no Kunou
Kimi to Boku o Tsunagu Mono
Mami Tomoe no Heibon no Nichijou
Oninagi
Puella Magi Kazumi Magica
 Puella Magi Suzune Magica
S Senjō no Tena
Slow Loop (ongoing)
Tamayomi (ongoing)
Tonari no Kashiwagi-san
Yumekui Merry
Yurucamp (until 2019, moved to Comic Fuz)

Anime adaptations 
 Yumekui Merry – Winter 2011
 Hanayamata – Summer 2014
 Gakkō Gurashi! – Summer 2015
 Anne Happy – Spring 2016
 Yurucamp – Winter 2018
 Harukana Receive – Summer 2018
 Tamayomi – Spring 2020
 Yurucamp Season 2 – Winter 2021
 Slow Loop – Winter 2022

Live Film and Drama adaptations 
 Gakkō Gurashi! – Winter 2019
 Yurucamp – Winter 2020
 Yurucamp 2 – Spring 2021

Game adaptations
 Hanayamata: Yosakoi Live! – November 13, 2014
 Hanayamata: Yosakoi Puzzle! – April 26, 2015
 Kirara Fantasia – December 11, 2017
 Yurucamp Virtual – Winter 2021

References

Monthly manga magazines published in Japan
Magazines established in 2006
2006 establishments in Japan
Seinen manga magazines
Houbunsha magazines